Volcano is the fifth studio album by Norwegian black metal band Satyricon. It was released on October 25, 2002, through Moonfog Productions. The album is one of the band's more successful records, having won several awards including the Norwegian Grammy for Best Metal Album, Alarm awards for Metal Album of the Year, Song of the Year for "Fuel for Hatred" and an Oslo award for Best Overall Album. A video was made for the single "Fuel for Hatred".

Background 

The beginning of the first track is a sample of Russell Crowe's dialogue from the movie Gladiator.

Track listing

Personnel

Satyricon 
 Satyr (Sigurd Wongraven) – vocals, guitar, bass guitar, arrangement, production, recording, engineering, mixing and mastering
 Frost (Kjetil-Vidar Haraldstad) – drums

Session 
 Anja Garbarek – vocals on "Angstridden", "Mental Mercury" and "Black Lava"
 Erik Ljunggren – programming, keyboards

Production 
 Erik Ljunggren – recording and engineering
 Michael H. Fernando – recording and engineering
 "Critter" – mixing
 Espen Berg – mastering

Charts

References 

Satyricon (band) albums
2002 albums
Capitol Records albums